Rufat Oleg oglu Dadashov (born 29 September 1991) is an Azerbaijani footballer who plays as a striker for German club Schalke 04 II and the Azerbaijan national team.

Career
Born in Baku to an Lezgin family, Dadashov has played club football in Germany for SV Wehen Wiesbaden, Mainz 05, FV Biebrich, SV Gonsenheim, 1. FC Kaiserslautern II, SVN Zweibrücken and 1. FC Saarbrucken.

In June 2016, he signed with ZFC Meuselwitz.

On 5 April 2018, Dadashov signed with a two-year contract with SC Preußen Münster.

On 13 January 2020, Dadashov signed with Phoenix Rising FC of the USL Championship. In his first game with the team on 7 March 2020, he scored a hat trick in a 6–1 win over Portland Timbers 2.

In August 2021 he returned to Germany, signing with Schalke 04 II.

He made his first team debut for Schalke 04 in a 2–1 away defeat against FC St. Pauli on 4 December 2021.

International career
Dadashov made his national team debut on 1 February 2013 against Uzbekistan in a friendly match. He scored his first goal on 29 May 2013 against Qatar in a friendly match. On 14 August 2013, he scored two goals in a friendly against Malta.

Career statistics

Scores and results list Azerbaijan's goal tally first, score column indicates score after each Dadashov goal.

Honors

Individual 
 USL Championship All-League Second Team: 2020

References

External links

1991 births
Living people
Azerbaijani footballers
Azerbaijan international footballers
Azerbaijani people of Lezgian descent
Footballers from Baku
Association football forwards
SV Wehen Wiesbaden players
1. FSV Mainz 05 players
FV Biebrich players
SV Gonsenheim players
1. FC Kaiserslautern II players
SVN Zweibrücken players
1. FC Saarbrücken players
Berliner FC Dynamo players
SC Preußen Münster players
Phoenix Rising FC players
FC Schalke 04 II players
FC Schalke 04 players
Regionalliga players
3. Liga players
USL Championship players
2. Bundesliga players
Azerbaijani expatriate footballers
Expatriate footballers in Germany
Azerbaijani expatriate sportspeople in Germany
Expatriate soccer players in the United States
Azerbaijani expatriate sportspeople in the United States